Anime USA (AUSA) is an annual three-day anime convention held during October/November at the Hyatt Regency Crystal City at Reagan National Airport in Arlington, Virginia.

Programming
The convention typically features an AMV contest, artist's alley, cosplay contest, dealer's room, host club/maid cafe, LARP, musical performances, tabletop gaming, video rooms, and workshop rooms.

History
The Northern Virginia Anime Association first organized the convention. Anime USA moved from the Sheraton Premiere in Tyson's Corner to the Hyatt Regency Crystal City in 2007, a location previously used by Katsucon and Otakon, due to the convention's growth. Renovations and the Hyatt Regency Crystal City layout caused problems during the 2008 convention. In 2010, the video games room was located in a sectioned off part of the parking garage, with at times a cap of 45 people, due to crowding and fire marshal concerns. In 2011 the video game room had to moved out of the parking garage due to concerns from the fire marshal, causing board gaming to be cancelled. For 2012, Anime USA moved to the Washington Marriott Wardman Park in Washington, D.C.

The convention partnered with the Make-A-Wish Foundation in 2011 to help an ill girl attend the convention. The conventions charity auction raised $3,621.25 for the Taylor Anderson '04 Memorial Gift Fund in 2011. The charity auction in 2012 benefited The DC Arts and Humanities Education Collaborative. Anime USA 2020 was cancelled due to the COVID-19 pandemic. No convention was held in 2021 due to the continuing COVID-19 pandemic, along with Anime USA's venue closing. 

Anime USA returned to the Hyatt Regency Crystal City At Reagan National Airport in 2022.

Event history

Notes

Notoriety
Edward Snowden attended Anime USA 2002 and received attention while playing the video game Tekken.

References

External links
Anime USA Website

Anime conventions in the United States
Recurring events established in 1999
1999 establishments in Virginia
Annual events in Virginia
Festivals in Virginia
Virginia culture
Tourist attractions in Arlington County, Virginia
Conventions in Virginia
Crystal City, Arlington, Virginia